Fissilobiceras ist ein glatter, komprimierter, involuter Ammonit aus dem unteren mittleren Jura  (Aalenium/Bajocium) Europas, der 1919 von Buckman benannt wurde. Fissilobiceras gehört zur Familie der Hildoceratoiden (Hammatoceratidae).

Fissilobiceras is similar to Shirbuirnia, except primarily for being more involute and having complex sutures. More of the inner whorls show in Shirbuirnia and its sutures are simple. Fissilobiceras also has a low keel running along the venter and only a small part of the inner whorls are exposed in the small umbilicus.

References

Arkell et al., 1957. Mesozoic Ammonoidea, Treatise on Invertebrate Paleontology Part L, Ammonoiea.  Geological Society of America and University of Kansas Press.
 Jack Sepkoski's Online Genus Database, 2002   
 Buckman, S.S., 1909–1930. Yorkshire Type Ammonites, weitergeführt als Typ Ammonites. London und Thame. 1–7 (790 pls).

Hammatoceratidae
Ammonitida genera
Middle Jurassic ammonites of Europe
Bajocian life